The 2022 Championnats Banque Nationale de Granby was a professional tennis tournament played on outdoor hard courts. It was the twenty-seventh (men) and tenth (women) editions of the tournament, which was part of the 2022 ATP Challenger Tour and a WTA 250 tournament on the 2022 WTA Tour. It took place in Granby, Quebec, Canada between 21 and 28 August 2022. This year marked the first year the tournament was upgraded to a WTA Tour tournament from an ITF Women's World Tennis Tour tournament.

Champions

Men's singles

 Gabriel Diallo def.  Shang Juncheng 7–5, 7–6(7–5).

Women's singles

  Daria Kasatkina def.  Daria Saville, 6–4, 6–4.

This was Kasatkina's sixth WTA Tour title, and second of the year.

Men's doubles

 Julian Cash /  Henry Patten def.  Jonathan Eysseric /  Artem Sitak, 6–3, 6–2.

Women's doubles

  Alicia Barnett /  Olivia Nicholls def.  Harriet Dart /  Rosalie van der Hoek, 5–7, 6–3, [10–1]

Men's singles main-draw entrants

Seeds

1 Rankings are as of August 15, 2022.

Other entrants
The following players received wildcards into the singles main draw:
 Juan Carlos Aguilar
 Gabriel Diallo
 Marko Stakusic

The following players received entry into the singles main draw as alternates:
  Sekou Bangoura
  Strong Kirchheimer

The following players received entry from the qualifying draw:
 Alafia Ayeni
 Justin Boulais
 Colin Markes
 Dan Martin
 Aidan Mayo
 Luke Saville

The following player received entry as a lucky loser:
  Osgar O'Hoisin

Women's singles main-draw entrants

Seeds

 1 Rankings are as of 15 August 2022.

Other entrants
The following players received wildcards into the singles main draw:
  Daria Kasatkina
  Victoria Mboko
  Katherine Sebov

The following player received entry as an alternate:
  Jamie Loeb

The following players received entry from the qualifying draw:
  Cadence Brace 
  Kayla Cross 
  Marina Stakusic
  Lulu Sun 

The following player received entry as a lucky loser:
  Himeno Sakatsume

Withdrawals
Before the tournament
  Lucia Bronzetti → replaced by  Himeno Sakatsume
  Dalma Gálfi → replaced by  Greet Minnen
  Beatriz Haddad Maia → replaced by  Rebecca Marino
  Ana Konjuh → replaced by  Maryna Zanevska
  Arantxa Rus → replaced by  Jaimee Fourlis
  Alison Van Uytvanck → replaced by  Jamie Loeb

Women's doubles main-draw entrants

Seeds

Rankings are as of August 15, 2022.

Other entrants
The following pairs received wildcards into the doubles main draw:
  Cadence Brace /  Marina Stakusic
  Kayla Cross /  Victoria Mboko

Withdrawals
Before the tournament
  Ulrikke Eikeri /  Catherine Harrison → replaced by  Ulrikke Eikeri /  Danka Kovinić
  Storm Sanders /  Ena Shibahara → replaced by  Daria Saville /  Ena Shibahara
  Panna Udvardy /  Tamara Zidanšek → replaced by  Tímea Babos /  Angela Kulikov
  Rosalie van der Hoek /  Alison Van Uytvanck → replaced by  Paula Kania-Choduń /  Renata Voráčová

References

External links
 Official website

2022 WTA Tour
2022 ATP Challenger Tour
2022 in Canadian tennis
Challenger de Granby
August 2022 sports events in Canada